Johannes Jacobus 'Johan' Spies  (born 8 May 1945) is a former South African rugby union player.

Playing career
He made his test debut for the Springboks in 1970 against the touring New Zealand team on 25 July 1970 at Loftus Versfeld in Pretoria. He played in all four test matches against the All Blacks. He toured with the Springboks to Australia during 1971 and played seven tour matches.

Test history

See also
List of South Africa national rugby union players – Springbok no. 446

References

1945 births
Living people
South African rugby union players
South Africa international rugby union players
Blue Bulls players
People from Harrismith
Rugby union players from the Free State (province)
Rugby union locks